Jack Higginson may refer to:

 Jack Higginson (athlete) (1891–1966), British Olympic athlete
 Jack Higginson (footballer) (1876–?), English footballer
 Jack Higginson (rugby league) (born 1997), rugby league player

See also 
 John Higginson (disambiguation)